Justice Dooley may refer to:

James A. Dooley (1914–1978), associate justice of the Supreme Court of Illinois
John Dooley (judge) (born 1944), associate justice of the Vermont Supreme Court

See also
Judge Dooley (disambiguation)